Acacias is a town and municipality in the Meta Department, Colombia. This town is one of the most important municipalities in terms of population and economy, together with La Macarena, Granada and the capital city of Villavicencio.
The name of the city is due to the acacia flowers that used to bloom in the region. It is considered one of the municipalities of Meta with more progress and development.

It is bordered to the north by the department of Cundinamarca. To the south with the municipalities Castilla la Nueva and Guamal. To the east with the municipality of San Carlos de Guaroa and to the west with the municipality of Guamal.

The National Administrative Department of Statistics (DANE), estimates for 2017, a total population of 72,048 inhabitants.

Geography 
In the urban area of this municipality there are 97 neighborhoods and housing developments, and in the rural area there are 48 rural districts, including Chichimene, Dinamarca and Manzanares. There are also former police stations.

Climate
Acacías has a tropical rainforest climate (Köppen Af) with extremely heavy rainfall from April to November, and more moderate though still substantial rainfall from December to March.

Economy 

 Throughout the municipality of Acacías, the main economic sector is agriculture and livestock. 
 Both light and medium industry is small, with a predominance of artisanal processes. 
 Mining and oil exploitation have recently acquired great importance. 
 The tertiary sector is evidenced by strong commerce in the urban area with an emphasis on the sale of finished products rather than services.

Ecology
The lands of Acacías are very rich in rivers such as: Acacias, Acaciítas, Guayuriba, Sardinata and Orotoy, as well as by the caños del Playón, Cola de pato, la Chiripa, Chichimene, La Danta, La Argentina, La Blanca and La Unión.

Tourism
Acacías has a great natural wealth, because it is surrounded by rivers, viewpoints and waterfalls. All this allows tourists and locals to perform different activities such as hiking, outdoor sports, bird watching, among others.

 Pink Lake or Laguna Rosada: This tourist attraction is located only 20 minutes from the center of the city of Acacías, in the village of San Cayetano. The lagoon is part of the wetland El Tapete. It is very important for the region because it is home to a large number of birds and different species of the llanera fauna. The color of the water is due to the maturation of the duck fern. However, it is forbidden to bathe in the lake for seaweed protection.
 El Sagú: It is a beautiful place near Acacías, recommended for hiking and rappelling. Located between San Pablo and El Pañuelo.
 Las Delicias: This site is ideal for bird watching, as well as to enjoy a good hike and a good swim in the waterfall. It is located in the village of El Playón, in the agrotourism farm Casa Roja.
 Caños Negros Waterfalls: You can perfectly admire the nature from these waterfalls. You can also hike and swim in the waterfalls. It is located in Alto Acaciitas.

In addition to the traditional tourist sites such as the central park, the cathedral, and the "manga de coleo", Acacías has the following tourist sites.

 El Malecón Turístico: This site is part of Acacías' heritage and is located at the entrance of the municipality, after the toll booth.
 Mirador Chichimene: Perfect place to admire the landscape and the beautiful sunrises and sunsets of the plains.
 Alto Acaciitas Viewpoint: Here, you can enjoy a beautiful view, a restaurant, natural water wells and two trails to walk.
 El Paraíso Ecopark: The ecopark offers activities suitable for everyone, recommended for the family in general. It is located only 14 km from Acacías, in the San Cayetano village.

References

Municipalities of Meta Department